The AAC Seastar Sealoon is a Canadian amateur-built flying boat, under development by Amphibian Airplanes of Canada. The aircraft is intended to be supplied as a kit for amateur construction.

Design and development

The aircraft is made from composites and aluminium with aircraft fabric covering. Construction time from the supplied kit is estimated as 1000 hours.

The company CEO, Hans Schaer, indicated in June 2010 that development of the Sealoon was being delayed by the ongoing Great Recession.

Specifications (Sealoon)

References

External links

Seastar Sealoon
2000s Canadian civil utility aircraft
Flying boats
Homebuilt aircraft
Single-engined pusher aircraft
Amphibious aircraft